Xanthodaphne raineri is a species of sea snail, a marine gastropod mollusk in the family Raphitomidae.

Description

Distribution
This marine species was found on the Abyssal Plain, Antarctica

References

External links
 Kantor Y.I., Harasewych M.G. & Puillandre N. (2016). A critical review of Antarctic Conoidea (Neogastropoda). Molluscan Research. 36(3): 153–206

raineri
Gastropods described in 2008